Cecil LeRoy "Sed" Hartman (May 13, 1900 – June 30, 1976) was an American football player and coach of football and basketball. He served as the head football coach at the University of Omaha—now known as the University of Nebraska–Omaha—from 1931 to 1942, compiling a record of 41–41–11. He was also the head basketball coach at Omaha from 1931 to 1935, tallying a mark of 56–12 Hartman played college football for the Nebraska Cornhuskers football team from 1921 to 1923 and was a member of multiple Missouri Valley Conference championship teams.

Head coaching record

Football

References

External links
 

1900 births
1976 deaths
American football fullbacks
Basketball coaches from Nebraska
Nebraska Cornhuskers football players
Nebraska–Omaha Mavericks football coaches
Omaha Mavericks men's basketball coaches
Sportspeople from Lincoln, Nebraska
Players of American football from Nebraska